Dival (also Romanized as Dīvāl; also known as Dīyūl) is a village in Polan Rural District, Polan District, Chabahar County, Sistan and Baluchestan Province, Iran. At the 2006 census, its population was 507, in 84 families.

References 

Populated places in Chabahar County